Borj-e Bemuni Aqa (also Romanized as Borj-e Bemūnī Āqā; also known as Borj-e Mollā Valī Khān and Būbūnī Āqā) is a village in Howmeh Rural District, in the Central District of Behbahan County, Khuzestan Province, Iran. At the 2006 census, its population was 180, in 35 families.

References 

Populated places in Behbahan County